Dance in Indonesia  reflects the country's diversity of ethnicities and cultures. There are more than 1,300 ethnic groups in Indonesia. Austronesian roots and Melanesian tribal forms are visible, and influences ranging from neighboring Asian and even western styles through colonization. Each ethnic group has its own dances: there are more than 3,000 original dance forms in Indonesia. The old traditions of dance and drama are being preserved in the many dance schools which flourish not only in the courts but also in the modern, government-run or supervised art academies.

For classification purposes, the dances of Indonesia can be divided according to several aspects. In the historical aspect it can be divided into three eras; the prehistoric-tribal era, the Hindu-Buddhist era, and the era of Islam. According to its patrons, it can be divided into two genres; court dance and folk dance. In its tradition, Indonesian dances can be divided into two types; traditional dance and contemporary dance.

In Bali on 19 November 2011 UNESCO announced the traditional Saman dance from Aceh province as a world Intangible Cultural Heritage. Saman dance is unique due to the speed of movement and harmony between dancers.

On 2 December 2015 UNESCO also announced Three Genres traditional Balinese dances from Bali province as a world Intangible Cultural Heritage.

Historical eras

The Prehistoric Tribal Era

Prior to their contact with the outer world the people of the Indonesian archipelago had already developed their own styles of dancing, still somewhat preserved by those who resist outside influences and choose tribal life in the interior of Sumatra (example: Batak, Nias, Mentawai), of Kalimantan/Borneo (example: Dayak, Punan, Iban), of Java (example: Baduy), of Sulawesi (example: Toraja, Minahasa), of the Moluccan Islands and of Papua (example: Dani, Amungme).

Dances in Indonesia are believed by many scholars to have had their beginning in rituals and religious worship. Such dances are usually based on rituals, like the war dances, the dance of witch doctors, and dance to call for rain or any agricultural related rituals such as Hudoq dance ritual of Dayak people. War dances such as cakalele of Maluku and kabasaran dance of Minahasa, North Sulawesi. Others are inspired by nature, such as the Tari Merak (Peafowl dance) of West Java. Ancient forms are usually characterized by repetitive movements like the Tor-Tor dance of the Batak people of (North Sumatra). The dancing also is meant to let the human's inner spirit come out, and also to calm or appease the spirits. Some of the tribal dances involving trance mental condition which interpreted as channeling the spirits through the dancer's body movements. Tari Sanghyang Dedari is a special dance of Bali, in which the dancers are pre-pubescent girls in trance, chasing away bad spirits. The dance of kuda lumping and keris dance also involve trance.

The Hindu-Buddhist Era

With the advent of Dharmic religions in Indonesia, Hinduism and Buddhism were celebrated in ritual and in art. Although the poem originates in India, Ramayana and Mahabharata epic has long been adopted by the Javanese people. Etchings of the story can be found on temples dating back to the tenth century CE, and has since then played a recurring role in ancient Javanese literature as well as wayang shows.

They incorporated stories of the Ramayana, Mahabharata and also Panji cycles into dance-drama, which is called sendratari (dance-drama) or sometimes simply translated as "ballet", such as Ramayana Ballet of Java and Bali. Highly stylized methods of dances were developed and are still obvious nowadays, especially in the islands of Java and Bali. The Javanese Ramayana dance-drama is regularly staged and performed in ninth century Prambanan temple compound, Yogyakarta; while its Balinese counterpart is also performed in various Balinese temples throughout the island. The Javanese wayang wong dance-drama took stories from the episodes of Ramayana or Mahabharata Hindu epic. However, the dances are distinct to those of Indian. While hand gestures are still very important, Indonesian dancers do not have the Indian attention to mudra: instead the dances incorporated local forms. Javanese court dances stressed on graceful and slow movements while the dances of Balinese court are more dynamic and very expressive. The Javanese sacred ritual dance of Bedhaya has very gentle and elegant moves. It is believed to have its root in 14th century Majapahit court or probably earlier, which originated as ritual dance performed by virgins to worship Indic deities such as Shiva, Brahma, and Vishnu.

In Bali, dances has become the integral part of Hindu Balinese rituals. Experts believed that balinese dance derived from older dance tradition of Java. Friezes on East Javanese temples built during the 14th century show headdresses almost identical to those still being used for dances in Bali today. These represent a remarkable unbroken continuity of form at least 600 years old. Certain sacred dances are reserved and only performed during certain religious ceremony. Each Balinese dances have special functions, from sacred ritual dances performed only in Balinese temples such as sacred sanghyang dedari and Barong dance that involved trance, dance drama that retold the legends and popular stories such as legong and kecak, to the dance for welcoming guests such as pendet or social youth dance such as joged. The topeng dance also popular in Java and Bali, it often took story from Panji tales, originated from 12th century Kediri kingdom. The notable topeng dances are topeng Cirebon dance, Sundanese topeng Priangan dance and topeng Bali dance. The Panji tales, telling the romance between Prince Panji Inu of the ancient Javanese kingdom of Jenggala with Princess Galuh Chandra Kirana of the neighboring kingdom of Kediri, continues to be a source of inspiration in both Javanese and Balinese dance traditions.

The Islamic Era

Even as the new religion of Islam gradually penetrated the region, the native and dharmic dances continued to be popular. Artists and performers would still use the styles of the previous eras, making changes in stories (which took an Islamic turn) and clothing (which became more modest in respect of Islamic teachings). This change is obvious in Tari Persembahan from Jambi. The dancers are still adorned with the intricate gold of the Hindu/Buddhist era but the clothing is more modest.

The new era brought newer styles of dance: Zapin dances of the Malay people and Acehnese Tari Saman adopted dance styles and musics typical of Arabia and Persia, and combined them with indigenous styles to form a newer generation of dance in the era of Islam. The adoption of Persian and Arab musical instruments, such as rebana, tambur, and gendang drums that has become the main instrument in Islamic dances, as well as chant that often quotes Islamic chants.

Contemporary dances
Known contemporary dancers from Indonesia was Bagong Kussudiardja, which invented contemporary dance form inspired by the Javanese classical dance.

Patrons

The court dances

The dances in Indonesia reflects its diverse and long history. Several royal houses; the istanas and keratons still survived in some parts of Indonesia and become the haven of cultural conservation. The obvious difference between courtly dance and common folk dance traditions is the most evident in Javanese dance. Javanese stratified social class is reflected in its culture, where the upper noble class are more concentrated and deeply concern with refinement, spiritual and sophistication; while the commoners are usually more interested in entertainment and social value of the dance. As the result court dances are often have strict rules and disciplines preserved through generations, while folk dances are more liberated and open to any influences.

The royal patronage of arts and culture is often encouraged by the palace institution as the guardian of their traditions. For example, the Sultans of Yogyakarta Sultanate and Sunans of Surakarta, also nobles of Pakualaman and Mangkunegaran are known to create various Javanese court dances completed with gamelan composition to accompanied the dance. For example, the Suryo Sumirat dance school of Mangkunegaran court, opened its doors to public and foreign students eager to learn the royal Javanese dance. The mission is to not only produce new royal dancers but also, more importantly, to preserve ancient royal dance.

The palace court traditions also evident in Balinese and Malay court which usually— just like Java—imposed refinement and prestige. Sumatran Malay courtly culture such as the remnant of Aceh Sultanate, Deli Sultanate in North Sumatra, and South Sumatra Sultanate, are more influenced by Islamic culture, while Java and Bali are more deeply rooted in their Hindu-Buddhist heritage. The Palembang dance of Gending Sriwijaya for example, still demonstrating the Hindu-Buddhist elements of gilded ornaments, but compared to its Javanese counterpart, it is rendered in more covered and modest costume of Aesan Gede.

The folk dances

The dance in Indonesia demonstrate the social complexity and the social stratifications of its people, it often reflect the social class and also degree of refinement. According to its patron, the folk dances were developed and fostered by common people, either in the villages or in the cities, in contrast of court dance that is developed through royal patronage. Indonesian folk dances are often relatively free from strict rules nor disciplines, although certain style of gestures, poses and movements are still preserved. The commoners folk dance is more concerned with social function and entertainment value than rituals.

The Javanese Ronggeng and Sundanese Jaipongan is the fine example of this common folk dance traditions. Both are social dances that are more for entertainment purpose than rituals. It often display movements that are considered inappropriate in refined courtly dances, as the result, the common folk dances were often mistakenly deemed too erotic or even too crude for court standard. However this traditions is alive and well in contemporary Indonesia since it is popular and supported by its people. Certain traditional folk dances has been developed into mass dance with simple but structurized steps and movements, such as Poco-poco dance from Minahasa North Sulawesi, and Sajojo dance from Papua.

Traditions

The traditional dance
Traditional dance of Indonesia reflect the rich diversity of Indonesian people. The dance traditions in Indonesia; such as Balinese, Javanese, Sundanese, Minangkabau, Palembang, Malay, Aceh and many other dances traditions are age old traditions, yet also a living and dynamic traditions. Certain traditional dances might be centuries old, while some others might have been created less than a decade ago. The creation of a new dance choreography but still within the frame of respected dance tradition and discipline is still possible. As the result, there is some kreasi baru (newly created) dances. The newly created dance could be the rediscovery and the revival of lost old traditions or a new interpretation, inspiration and exploration of traditional dances.

The Art Schools in Indonesia such as Sekolah Tinggi Seni Indonesia (STSI) in Bandung, Institut Kesenian Jakarta (IKJ) in Jakarta, Institut Seni Indonesia (ISI/Indonesian Art Institute) in Denpasar, Yogyakarta, and Surakarta all are fostering and encouraging their student to explore the dance traditions in Indonesia. Certain festival such as Bali Art Festival also known as the distinguished event for Balinese traditional dance choreographers to showcase their Balinese kreasi baru dances.

The contemporary dance

Indonesian contemporary dance borrows influences from abroad, such as western ballet and modern dance. In 1954, two artists from Yogyakarta — Bagong Kusudiarjo and Wisnuwardhana — journeyed to the United States to study ballet and modern dance with a number of dance companies. When they returned to Indonesia in 1959 they brought with them a new artistic culture, which changed the face of movement and choreography and introduced the idea of individual expression to Indonesian dance. The idea of dance as individual expression and artistic exploration rejuvenate the tradition-based dance discipline of traditional Indonesia, through exposure to artists from a wide range of cultural and artistic backgrounds. Native traditional dance traditions often influenced the contemporary dance in Indonesia, such as traditional Javanese dance form, pose and poise often took place in contemporary dances performances.

International dance collaborations also possible and often took place, such as the collaboration of Noh Japanese dance with Balinese and Javanese dance theatre. Another example is the collaboration of two dance traditions, between Indonesian Balinese Legong dance and Indian Bharata Natyam. Legong and Bharata Natyam's similarities extend to more than its roots or spirituality. Both are joyful celebrations of life and a shared classical heritage of culture and dance.

Indonesian modern dance also showcased in Indonesian showbiz, such as the dance performance to accompany songs, music performances or entertainment. Today with rapid pop culture influences from abroad, especially United States, urban teen dances such as street dances also gain popularity among Indonesian youngsters.

List of dances

Balinese 

 Baris
 Barong
 Cendrawasih
 Condong
 Gambuh
 Janger
 Joged
 Kebyar duduk
 Kecak
 Legong
 Mageret Pandan
 Manuk Rawa
 Oleg
 Panyembrama
 Pendet
 Rejang
 Sanghyang
 Sekar Jepun
 Topeng

Javanese 

 Bambangan cakil
 Bedhaya
 Gambyong
 Gandrung
 Golek
 Jurit ampil kridha warastra
 Kuda lumping
 Lengger
 Lengger lanang
 Remo
 Reog Ponorogo
 Ronggeng
 Serimpi
 Singo Ulung
 Topeng Ireng
 Topeng Malang
 Wayang gedog
 Wayang wong

Sundanese 

 Bajidor Kahot
 Dewi
 Jaipongan
 Keurseus
 Kupu-kupu
 Merak
 Ratu Graeni
 Reog Sunda
 Sisingaan
 Badaya Wirahmasari
 Topeng Priangan
 Ratu Graeni 
 Arimbi
 Sisingaan
 Kuda Lumping

Cirebonese 
 Topeng Cirebon

Betawi 
 Cokek
 Lenggang Betawi
 Ondel-ondel
 Ronggeng
 Topeng Betawi
 Yapong

Acehnese 
 Didong
 Likok Pulo
 Ranub lam Puan
 Rapai Geleng
 Ratoh Duek
 Ratoh Jaroe
 Rodat
 Saman
 Seudati

Batak
 Sigale-gale
 Tandok
 Tor-tor

Minangkabau 
 Alang Babega
 Indang
 Lilin
 Pasambahan
 Payung
 Piring
 Randai
 Rantak

Palembangese 
 Gending Sriwijaya
 Kebagh
 Mejeng Basuko
 Pagar pengantin
 Rodat Cempako
 Tanggai

Malay 
 Bangsawan
 Joget Melayu
 Persembahan
 Sekapur Sirih
 Tandak
 Zapin
 Zapin Api

Lampung 
 Melinting

Banjarese 
 Baksa kembang
 Topeng Banjar

Dayak 
 Gantar
 Hudoq
 Kancet Papatai
 Kancet Ledo
 Kancet Lasan
 Kuyang
 Serumpai

Minahasan 
 Kabasaran
 Maengket
 Poco-poco

Torajan 
 Ma'badong

Buginese–Makassarese 
 Gandrang Bulo
 Paduppa
 Pajoge
 Pakarena
 Paraga
 Pepe-Pepeka ri Makka

Sasak and Timorese 
 Rudat
 Tebe

Moluccan and Papuan 
 Cakalele
 Sajojo

Chinese 
 Barongsai
 Liang Liong

See also

 Javanese dance
 Balinese dance
 Sundanese dance
 Culture of Indonesia

Notes

External links
 An example of how diverse Indonesian dances can be (Komunitas Tari Fisip Ul Radha Sarisha, Indonesia - XXXI IFM Lublin 2016)

 
Indonesian culture
Dances of Indonesia